Jennifer McKinley is a scientist from Northern Ireland, UK. She is currently a Reader at the School of Natural and Built Environment, Queen's University Belfast. Her main areas of research interest include geostatistics, GIS, soil geochemistry, forensics geoscience, weathering. She is the elected president of International Association for Mathematical Geosciences for the period during 2016-2020. She was awarded Chartered Fellow of the Geological Society of London in 2009, a Fellowship awarded competitively.

Education
BSc (Hons) in Geology, 1984, Queen's University Belfast
PGCE, 1985, Queen's University Belfast
PhD in Geology, 2001, Queen's University Belfast

Employment
2016–Present: Reader, School of Natural and Built Environment, Queen's University Belfast
2010 - 2016: 	Senior Lecturer, School of Geography, Archaeology and Palaeoecology (GAP) Queen's University Belfast
2004 - 2010: 	Lecturer, School of GAP, Queen's University Belfast
2001 - 2004:	EPSRC Post-doctoral Research Fellow, School of GAP, Queen's University Belfast
1995 - 1998:    Associate Lecturer, Open University Belfast
1985 - 1987:    Teacher, Regent House Grammar school, Newtownards, Co Down

Books
Alastair Ruffell, Jennifer McKinley, "Geoforensics", John Wiley & Sons, 2008, p. 340.

References

External links

Living people
Academics of Queen's University Belfast
Scientists from Northern Ireland
Year of birth missing (living people)
Alumni of Queen's University Belfast